Limfjordsbroen is a Danish bridge which connects Nørresundby and Aalborg over Limfjord, a shallow sound. It was inaugurated 30 March 1933 in the presence of approximately 30,000 spectators and attended by Thorvald Stauning. It was a toll bridge until 1935. The first fixed link between the two cities was established in 1865 in the form of a pontoon bridge, which was in use until the present bridge was established; the original bridge was slow to open and close when ship traffic passed. The bridge was built, without any fatalities, between 1930–33 with 100-200 workers on the construction site. Large sections were built on Aalborg's waterfront west of the bridge's current location. A week before the inauguration, a load test occurred with 48 fully laden trucks placed on the bridge's leaf. A bike path and walking area were added as well. The horizontal clearance measures . Route 180 crosses the bridge.

References

External links

Bridges in Denmark
Bascule bridges
Road bridges in Denmark
Former toll bridges
Bridges completed in 1933
1933 establishments in Denmark
Buildings and structures in Aalborg Municipality
Limfjord